Michel Dubois (born November 7, 1954) is a Canadian former professional ice hockey player who played in the World Hockey Association (WHA). Dubois played parts of two WHA seasons with the Indianapolis Racers and Quebec Nordiques. He was drafted in the twelfth round of the 1974 WHA Amateur Draft by the Chicago Cougars.

References

External links

1954 births
Canadian ice hockey defencemen
Chicago Cougars draft picks
Chicoutimi Saguenéens (QMJHL) players
Ice hockey people from Montreal
Indianapolis Racers players
Living people
Long Island Cougars players
Maine Nordiques players
Mohawk Valley Comets (NAHL) players
Philadelphia Firebirds (AHL) players
Quebec Nordiques (WHA) players
Springfield Indians players